Buehler Foods, Inc., was an American grocery store chain based in Jasper, Indiana.

Buehler Foods was founded in 1940 by Gabe and Marge Buehler in Jasper, Indiana. The Buehlers operated a single store, but the company eventually grew to own a total of 22 stores in Illinois, Indiana and Kentucky. The company has a major presence in the Evansville, Indiana, market, with six stores in that city.

On April 24, 2008, Buehler Foods announced the company's intention to sell all of the company's stores to Houchens Industries of Bowling Green, Kentucky.

References 

Privately held companies based in Indiana